Brooke Langton (born November 27, 1970) is an American actress. She had significant guest roles on the NBC series Friday Night Lights and on Life, in which Langton played a district attorney. She found early success on The Net (1998–99), and she was the female lead in the 2000 comedy film The Replacements.

Early life
Langton was born in Arizona, United States. Her love of improvisational theatre started at Second City in Chicago. Studying with acting Larry Moss and Ivanna Chubbock, Langton pursued independent films.  Her first films Swingers, directed by Doug Lyman, and then Reach the Rock, produced by John Hughes (cult movie director of 16 Candles and many other iconic hits) as well as starring with Djimon Hounsou in another indy film Ink.

Langton was a regular cast member in the ABC adventure drama series, Extreme, co-starring opposite Julie Bowen and James Brolin. 

In 1996, Langton joined the cast of the Fox prime time series Melrose Place, playing Samantha Reilly Campbell. She starred in the show during its fifth and sixth season, leaving early in the seventh season. After leaving Melrose Place, Langton was cast as lead in the USA Network series, The Net, a television drama based on the 1995 film of the same name. Langton portrayed the character Angela Bennett, who was played by Sandra Bullock in the film. The series was canceled after one season. She later starred alongside Keanu Reeves and Gene Hackman in the 2000 film The Replacements, her biggest feature credit to date. Langton also co-starred in the comedy films Playing Mona Lisa (2000), and Kiss the Bride (2002).

In 2001, Langton had the leading role in the Fox crime drama series, Fling,  During her later career, she starred in a number of smaller films, including Partner(s) (2005) with Jay Harrington and Julie Bowen, and Beautiful Dreamer alongside Colin Egglesfield. In 2007, she starred in the horror film Primeval opposite Dominic Purcell. From 2007 to 2008, she had a recurring role in the NBC drama series, Friday Night Lights. During that same time she co-starred as Charlie Crews attorney Constance Griffiths in another NBC drama, Life. In later years, Langton guest starred on The Closer, Bones, and Supernatural.

In 2015 Langton participated as a contestant on the Swedish show Allt för Sverige (Everything for Sweden), where she competed against other Americans for the prize to get to know her Swedish family and roots. The series was broadcast on SVT. In the second episode it was revealed that Langton was a relative of actor Adolf Jahr.

Filmography

Film

Television

References

External links

1970 births
Living people
Actresses from Arizona
Actresses from Texas
American film actresses
American television actresses
21st-century American actresses
American female models
20th-century American actresses
American people of Swedish descent